Sejfulla Malëshova (2 March 1900 – 9 June 1971) was an Albanian politician, writer and translator. He was an early member of the Communist leadership in post-World War II Albania and served as the Ministry of Culture and Propaganda.

Biography 
Malëshova was born in Këlcyrë. He was educated in Vlorë and later studied medicine in Italy. In 1924, a 23-year-old Malëshova became Fan Noli's personal secretary. After Noli's government was overthrown, Malëshova fled to Vienna, where he joined KONARE, a revolutionary organization founded by Albanian leftists. He went to Moscow and Leningrad with a delegation of the group where he translated the Communist Manifesto into Albanian. In 1930–1932, he joined the Communist Party of the Soviet Union, but was subsequently expelled as a Bukharinist. He became a charter member of the Albanian Communist Party and a member of its Politburo prior until 1946. After Moscow, he moved to Paris where other Albanian revolutionaries like Llazar Fundo had settled. There was a rivalry between the two and twice Malëshova denounced Fundo as a Bukharinist.  In 1938, after the Comintern ordered Fundo's death, Malëshova attempted to murder him with an axe.

He used to appear as a self-proclaimed rebel poet of the guerrilla war against the Italian and German occupying armies in Albania, and became known by his pen name, Lame Kodra. In 1945, he was appointed Minister of Culture and Propaganda. In the same year, he was elected president of the newly founded League of Writers and Artists of Albania, which consisted of 74 members initially, with several non-communist intellectuals among them. The League took over the publication of well-known Albanian literature Drita magazine.

Malëshova had emerged as a moderate communist, often inviting publications without regard to their ideological content, which earned him the wrath of Enver Hoxha, particularly after an appeal by the Writers League to Harry Truman and Clement Attlee for Western recognition of Albania. In 1946, Koçi Xoxe, working under orders from Yugoslavia purged a number of members of the party, including Malëshova, who was denounced as a "right-wing opportunist".  In 1947, he was tried for subversive activities and imprisoned.

After leaving prison, Malëshova spent the rest of his life as a warehouseman in Fier, shunned by almost all his fellow citizens. If anyone dared speak to him, he would pinch his lips with his fingers, to remind them of the vow of eternal silence which would ensure his survival. He died there, an outcast, in 1971. His funeral was attended only by his sister, the gravedigger and two Sigurimi agents.

References 

1900 births
1971 deaths
People from Këlcyrë
People from Janina vilayet
Labour Party of Albania politicians
Members of the Parliament of Albania
20th-century Albanian poets
Albanian-language poets
Russian–Albanian translators
Albanian male poets
Albanian dissidents
Government ministers of Albania
Culture ministers of Albania